Chandrayaan-2 is the second lunar exploration mission developed by the Indian Space Research Organisation (ISRO), after Chandrayaan-1. It consists of a lunar orbiter, and also included the Vikram lander, and the Pragyan lunar rover, all of which were developed in India. The main scientific objective is to map and study the variations in lunar surface composition, as well as the location and abundance of lunar water.

The spacecraft was launched on its mission to the Moon from the second launch pad at the Satish Dhawan Space Centre in Andhra Pradesh on 22 July 2019 at 09:13:12 UTC by a GSLV Mark III-M1. The craft reached the Moon's orbit on 20 August 2019 and began orbital positioning manoeuvres for the landing of the Vikram lander. The lander and the rover were scheduled to land on the near side of the Moon, in the south polar region at a latitude of about 70° south on 6 September 2019 and conduct scientific experiments for one lunar day, which approximates to two Earth weeks. 

However, the lander crashed when it deviated from its intended trajectory while attempting to land on 6 September 2019. According to a failure analysis report submitted to ISRO, the crash was caused by a software glitch. ISRO will re-attempt a landing in 2023 with Chandrayaan-3.

History 
On 12 November 2007, representatives of the Roscosmos and ISRO signed an agreement for the two agencies to work together on the Chandrayaan-1's follow-up project, Chandrayaan-2. ISRO would have the prime responsibility for the orbiter and rover, while Roscosmos was to provide the lander. The Indian government approved the mission in a meeting of the Union Cabinet, held on 18 September 2008 and chaired by Prime Minister Manmohan Singh. The design of the spacecraft was completed in August 2009, with scientists of both countries conducting a joint review.

Although ISRO finalised the payload for Chandrayaan-2 on schedule, the mission was postponed in January 2013 and rescheduled to 2016 because Russia was unable to develop the lander on time. In 2012, there was a delay in the construction of the Russian lander for Chandrayaan-2 due of the failure of the Fobos-Grunt mission to Mars, since the technical issues connected with the Fobos-Grunt mission which were also used in the lunar projects including the lander for Chandrayaan-2 needed to be reviewed. When Russia cited its inability to provide the lander even by 2015, India decided to develop the lunar mission independently. With new mission timeline for Chandrayaan-2 and an opportunity for a Mars mission arising with launch window in 2013, unused Chandrayaan-2 orbiter hardware was repurposed to be used for Mars Orbiter Mission.

Chandrayaan-2 launch had been scheduled for March 2018 initially, but was first delayed to April and then to October 2018 to conduct further tests on the vehicle. On 19 June 2018, after the program's fourth Comprehensive Technical Review meeting, a number of changes in configuration and landing sequence were planned for implementation, pushing the launch to the first half of 2019. Two of the lander's legs received minor damage during one of the tests in February 2019.

Chandrayaan-2 launch was scheduled for 14 July 2019, 21:21 UTC (15 July 2019 at 02:51 IST local time), with the landing expected on 6 September 2019. However, the launch was aborted due to a technical glitch and was rescheduled. The launch occurred on 22 July 2019 at 09:13:12 UTC (14:43:12 IST) on the first operational flight of a GSLV MK III M1.

On 6 September 2019, the lander during its landing phase, deviated from its intended trajectory starting at  altitude, and had lost communication when touchdown confirmation was expected. Initial reports suggesting a crash  were confirmed by ISRO chairman K. Sivan, stating that "it must have been a hard landing". The Failure Analysis Committee concluded that the crash was caused by a software glitch. Unlike ISRO's previous record, the report of the Failure Analysis Committee has not been made public.

Chandrayaan-2 orbiter performed a collision avoidance manoeuvre at 14:52 UTC on 18 October 2021 to avert possible conjunction with Lunar Reconnaissance Orbiter. Both spacecraft were expected to come dangerously close to each other on 20 October 2021 at 05:45 UTC over the Lunar North pole.

Objectives 
The primary objectives of the Chandrayaan-2 lander were to demonstrate the ability to soft-land and operate a robotic rover on the lunar surface.

The scientific goals of the orbiter are:

 to study lunar topography, mineralogy, elemental abundance, the lunar exosphere, and signatures of hydroxyl and water ice.
 to study the water ice in the south polar region and thickness of the lunar regolith on the surface.
 to map the lunar surface and help to prepare 3D maps of it.

Design 
The name Chandrayaan means "mooncraft" in Sanskrit and Hindi. , the mission has an allocated cost of  9.78 billion (approximately US$141 million which includes  6 billion for the space segment and  3.75 billion as launch costs on GSLV Mk III M1. Chandrayaan-2 stack was initially put in an Earth parking orbit of  perigee and  apogee by the launch vehicle.

Orbiter 

It carries eight scientific instruments; two of which are improved versions of those flown on Chandrayaan-1. The Orbiter High Resolution Camera (OHRC) conducted high-resolution observations of the landing site prior to separation of the lander from the orbiter. The orbiter's structure was manufactured by Hindustan Aeronautics Limited and delivered to the ISRO Satellite Centre on 22 June 2015.

 Dimensions: 3.2 × 5.8 × 2.2 m 
 Gross lift-off mass:  
 Propellant mass:  
 Dry mass: 
 Power generation capacity: 1000 watts
 Mission duration: ~ 7.5 years, extended from the planned 1 year owing to the precise launch and mission management, in lunar orbit

Vikram lander 

The mission's lander is called Vikram  named after cosmic ray scientist Vikram Sarabhai (1919–1971), who is widely regarded as the founder of the Indian space programme. The Vikram lander detached from the orbiter and descended to a low lunar orbit of  using its  liquid main engines. After checking all of its on-board systems it attempted a soft landing that would have deployed the rover, and performed scientific activities for approximately 14 Earth days. Vikram crash-landed during this attempt.

The preliminary configuration study of the lander was completed in 2013 by the Space Applications Centre (SAC) in Ahmedabad. The lander's propulsion system consisted of eight  thrusters for attitude control and five  liquid main engines derived from ISRO's  liquid apogee motor. Initially, the lander design employed four main throttle-able liquid engines, but a centrally mounted fixed-thrust engine  was added to handle new requirements of having to orbit the Moon before landing. The additional engine was expected to mitigate upward draft of lunar dust during the soft landing. The four throttle-able engines of lander were capable of throttling between range of 40 to 100 percent incrementally in steps of 20%.Vikram was designed to safely land on slopes up to 12°.

Some associated technologies include:
 A high resolution camera, Laser Altimeter (LASA) 
 Lander Hazard Detection Avoidance Camera (LHDAC)
 Lander Position Detection Camera (LPDC) 
 Lander Horizontal Velocity Camera (LHVC), an 800 N throttleable liquid main engine 
 Attitude thrusters
 Ka-band radio altimeters
 Laser Inertial Reference and Accelerometer Package (LIRAP)  and the software needed to run these components.

Engineering models of the lander began undergoing ground and aerial tests in late October 2016, in Challakere in the Chitradurga district of Karnataka. ISRO created roughly 10 craters on the surface to help assess the ability of the lander's sensors to select a landing site.

 Dimensions:  
 Gross lift-off mass:  
 Propellant mass:  
 Dry mass: 
 Power generation capability: 650 watts
 Mission duration: ≤14 days (one lunar day)

Pragyan rover 

For navigation, the rover would have used:

 Stereoscopic camera-based 3D vision: two 1 megapixel, monochromatic navcams in front of the rover to provide the ground control team a 3D view of the surrounding terrain, and help in path-planning by generating a digital elevation model of the terrain. IIT Kanpur contributed to the development of the subsystems for light-based map generation and motion planning for the rover.
 Control and motor dynamics: the rover has a rocker-bogie suspension system and six wheels, each driven by independent brushless DC electric motors. Steering is accomplished by differential speed of the wheels or skid steering.

The expected operating time of Pragyan rover was one lunar day, or ~14 Earth days, as its electronics were not designed to endure the frigid lunar night. However, its power system has a solar-powered sleep/wake-up cycle implemented, which could have resulted in longer service time than planned. Two aft wheels of the rover had the ISRO logo and the State Emblem of India embossed on them to leave behind patterned tracks on the lunar surface.

 Dimensions: 0.9 × 0.75 × 0.85 m 
 Power: 50 watts
 Travel speed: 1 cm/sec
 Mission duration: ~14 Earth days (one lunar day)

Science payload 

ISRO selected eight scientific instruments for the orbiter, four for the lander, and two for the rover. While it was initially reported that NASA and European Space Agency (ESA) would participate in the mission by providing some scientific instruments for the orbiter, ISRO in 2010 had clarified that due to weight restrictions it will not be carrying foreign payloads on the mission. However, in an update a month before launch, an agreement between NASA and Indian Space Research Organisation (ISRO) was signed to include a small laser retroreflector from NASA to the lander's payload to measure the distance between the satellites above and the microreflector on the lunar surface.

Orbiter 

Payloads on the orbiter are:

 Chandrayaan-2 Large Area Soft X-ray Spectrometer (CLASS) from the ISRO Satellite Centre (ISAC), which makes use of X-ray fluorescence spectra to determine the elemental composition of the lunar surface 
 Solar X-ray monitor (XSM) from Physical Research Laboratory (PRL), Ahmedabad, primarily supports CLASS instrument by providing solar X-ray spectra and intensity measurements as input to it. Additionally these measurements will help in studying various high-energy processes occurring in the solar corona.
 Dual Frequency L-band and S-band Synthetic Aperture Radar (DFSAR) from the Space Applications Centre (SAC) for probing the first few metres of the lunar surface for the presence of different constituents. DFSAR was expected to provide further evidence confirming the presence of water ice, and its distribution below the shadowed regions of the Moon.
 Imaging IR Spectrometer (IIRS) from the SAC for mapping of lunar surface over a wide wavelength range for the study of minerals, water molecules and hydroxyl present. It featured an extended spectral range (0.8 μm to 5 μm), an improvement over previous lunar missions whose payloads worked up to 3 μm.
 Chandrayaan-2 Atmospheric Compositional Explorer 2 (ChACE-2)  Quadrupole Mass Analyzer from Space Physics Laboratory (SPL) to carry out a detailed study of the lunar exosphere
 Terrain Mapping Camera-2 (TMC-2) from SAC for preparing a three-dimensional map essential for studying the lunar mineralogy and geology 
 Radio Anatomy of Moon Bound Hypersensitive Ionosphere and Atmosphere – Dual Frequency Radio Science experiment (RAMBHA-DFRS) by SPL for the studying electron density in the lunar ionosphere 
 Orbiter High Resolution Camera (OHRC) by SAC for scouting a hazard-free spot prior to landing. Used to help prepare high-resolution topographic maps and digital elevation models of the lunar surface.

Vikram lander 
The payloads on the Vikram lander were:

 Instrument for Lunar Seismic Activity (ILSA) MEMS based seismometer by LEOS for studying Moon-quakes near the landing site 
 Chandra's Surface Thermo-physical Experiment (ChaSTE) thermal probe jointly developed by SPL, Vikram Sarabhai Space Centre (VSSC)  and Physical Research Laboratory (PRL), Ahmedabad for estimating the thermal properties of the lunar surface 
 RAMBHA-LP Langmuir probe by SPL, VSSC for measuring the density and variation of lunar surface plasma
 A laser retroreflector array (LRA) by the Goddard Space Flight Center for taking precise measurements of distance between the reflector on the lunar surface and satellites in lunar orbit.

Pragyan rover 
Pragyan rover carried two instruments to determine the abundance of elements near the landing site:

 Laser induced Breakdown Spectroscope (LIBS) from the laboratory for Electro Optic Systems (LEOS), Bangalore
 Alpha Particle Induced X-ray Spectroscope (APXS) from PRL, Ahmedabad

Mission profile

Launch 

The launch of Chandrayaan-2 was initially scheduled for 14 July 2019, 21:21 UTC (15 July 2019 at 02:51 IST local time). However, the launch was aborted 56 minutes and 24 seconds before launch due to a technical glitch, so it was rescheduled to 22 July 2019. Unconfirmed reports later cited a leak in the nipple joint of a helium gas bottle as the cause of cancellation.

Finally Chandrayaan-2 was launched on board the GSLV MK III M1 launch vehicle on 22 July 2019 at 09:13 UTC (14:43 IST) with a better-than-expected apogee as a result of the cryogenic upper stage being burned to depletion, which later eliminated the need for one of the apogee-raising burns during the geocentric phase of mission. This also resulted in the saving of around 40 kg fuel on board the spacecraft.

Immediately after launch, multiple observations of a slow-moving bright object over Australia were made, which could be related to upper stage venting of residual LOX / LH2 propellant after the main burn.

Geocentric phase 

After being placed into a 45,475 × 169 km parking orbit by the launch vehicle, the Chandrayaan-2 spacecraft stack gradually raised its orbit using on-board propulsion over 22 days. In this phase, one perigee-raising and five apogee-raising burns were performed to reach a highly eccentric orbit of 142,975 × 276 km followed by trans-lunar injection on 13 August 2019. Such a long Earth-bound phase with multiple orbit-raising manoeuvres exploiting the Oberth effect was required because of the limited lifting capacity of the launch vehicle and thrust of the spacecraft's on-board propulsion system. A similar strategy was used for Chandrayaan-1 and the Mars Orbiter Mission during their Earth-bound phase trajectory. On 3 August 2019, the first set of Earth images were captured by the LI4 camera on the Vikram lander, showing the North American landmass.

Selenocentric phase 
After 29 days from its launch, the Chandrayaan-2 spacecraft stack entered lunar orbit on 20 August 2019 after performing a lunar orbit insertion burn for 28 minutes 57 seconds. The three-spacecraft stack was placed into an elliptical orbit that passed over the polar regions of the Moon, with  aposelene and  periselene. By 1 September 2019, this elliptical orbit was made nearly circular with  aposelene and  periselene after four orbit-lowering manoeuvres  followed by separation of Vikram lander from the orbiter on 07:45 UTC, 2 September 2019.

Planned landing site 

The prime landing site (PLS54) was at 70.90267°S 22.78110°E ( from the south pole,) and the alternate landing site (ALS01) was at 67.87406° South 18.46947° West. The prime site was on a high plain between the craters Manzinus C and Simpelius N, on the near side of the Moon.

Loss of Vikram 

Vikram began its descent at 20:08:03 UTC, 6 September 2019 and was scheduled to land on the Moon at around 20:23 UTC. The descent and soft-landing were to be performed by the on-board computers on Vikram, with mission control unable to make corrections. However, it contradicted initial claims from anonymous ISRO officials that the lander was intact and lying in a tilted position.

Radio transmissions from the lander were tracked during descent by analysts using a  radio telescope owned by the Netherlands Institute for Radio Astronomy. The powered descent was also observed by NASA's Lunar Reconnaissance Orbiter (LRO) using its Lyman-Alpha Mapping Project instrument to study changes in the lunar exosphere due to exhaust gases from the lander's engines. K. Sivan, tasked senior scientist Prem Shanker Goel to head the Failure Analysis Committee to look into the causes of the failure.

Both ISRO and NASA attempted to communicate with the lander for about two weeks before the lunar night set in,Chandrayaan-2: The Sun has finally set on Vikram lander  Swathi Moorthy, Money Control 22 September 2019 while NASA's LRO flew over on 17 September 2019 and acquired some images of the intended landing zone. However, the region was near dusk, causing poor lighting for optical imaging.NASA Moon Orbiter Fails to Spot India's Lunar Lander: Report  Leonard David, space.com 18 September 2019 NASA's LRO images, showing no sight of the lander, were released on 26 September 2019. The LRO flew over again on 14 October 2019 under more favorable lighting conditions,NASA still searching for India's Chandrayaan-2 Vikram moon lander  Amanda Kooser, CNET 18 September 2019 but was unable to locate it.NASA finds no trace of India's Chandrayaan-2 Vikram lander in latest pics by Moon orbiter  The Economic Times 24 October 2019 The LRO performed a third flyover on 10 November 2019.

On 16 November 2019, the Failure Analysis Committee released its report to the Space Commission, concluding that the crash was caused by a software glitch. Phase One of descent from an altitude of 30 km to 7.4 km above the Moon's surface went as intended with velocity being reduced from 1683 m/s to 146 m/s. Engines of Vikram lander were capable of throttling between range of 40 to 100% only in increments of 20%. Throttling engines in this gradational manner was insufficient in reducing the velocity responsively and hence velocity during the second phase of descent was more than expected. Coupled with other control and a guidance related issues this deviation from nominal velocity reduction was beyond the designed parameters of on-board software, causing Vikram to land hard, though it managed to impact relatively near the intended landing site. The complete findings have not been made public. While initially estimated to be within  of the intended landing site, best-guess estimates from satellite imagery indicate initial impact about 600 m away. The spacecraft shattered upon impact, with debris scattered over almost two dozen locations in an area spanning kilometres.

The orbiter part of the mission, with eight scientific instruments, remains operational, and will continue its seven-year mission to study the Moon.

 Telemetry, tracking, and command (TT&C) 
During various phases of launch and spacecraft operations of Chandrayaan-2 mission, the TT&C support was provided by ISRO Telemetry, Tracking and Command Network (ISTRAC), Indian Deep Space Network (IDSN), NASA Deep Space Network and National Institute for Space Research's (INPE) ground stations located in Alcântara and Cuiabá.

 Aftermath 
There was an outpouring of support for ISRO from various quarters in the aftermath of the crash landing of its lunar lander. However, prominent Indian news media also criticized ISRO's lack of transparency regarding the crash of the lander and its analysis of the crash. Indian media also noted that unlike ISRO's previous record, the report of the Failure Analysis Committee was not made public and RTI queries seeking it were denied by ISRO citing section 8(1) of the RTI Act. ISRO's lack of consistency regarding the explanation around the rover's crashing was criticized, with the organization providing no proof of its own positions until the efforts of NASA and a Chennai based volunteer located the crash site on the lunar surface. In the wake of the events surrounding Chandrayaan-2, former ISRO employees criticized unverified statements from the ISRO chairman and what they claimed is the top-down leadership and working culture of the organization.

 Scientists involved in the mission 

Key scientists and engineers involved in the development of Chandrayaan-2 include:Chandrayaan-2: India launches second Moon mission  BBC News 22 July 2019

 Ritu Karidhal – Mission Director
 Muthayya Vanitha – Project Director
 K. Kalpana– Associate Project Director 
 G. Narayanan – Associate Project Director 
 G. Nagesh – Project Director (former) 
 Chandrakanta Kumar – Deputy Project Director (Radio-frequency systems)
 Amitabh Singh – Deputy Project Director (Optical Payload Data Processing, Space Applications Centre (SAC)) 

 Chandrayaan-3 

In November 2019, ISRO officials stated that a new lunar lander mission is being studied for launch in August 2022; this new proposal is called Chandrayaan-3 and it would be a re-attempt to demonstrate the landing capabilities needed for the Lunar Polar Exploration Mission proposed in partnership with Japan for 2024. If funded, this re-attempt would not include launching an orbiter. The proposed configuration would have a detachable propulsion module, behaving like a communications relay satellite, a lander and a rover. According to VSSC director, S. Somanath, there will be more follow-up missions in the Chandrayaan programme.

According to The Times of India'', work on Chandrayaan-3 commenced on 14 November 2019.

See also 

 Beresheet lander – Concurrent lunar lander mission, crash-landed on the Moon
 Chandrayaan-3
 LUPEX
 Exploration of the Moon
 List of missions to the Moon
 List of ISRO missions
 Lunar resources

References

External links 

 Official Chandrayaan-2 mission page , by the Indian Space Research Organisation
 GSLV-Mk III launcher , by the Indian Space Research Organisation

Missions to the Moon
Lunar rovers
Indian lunar exploration programme
Space probes launched in 2019
2019 in India
ISRO space probes
Space synthetic aperture radar
Spacecraft launched by GSLV rockets
Satellites orbiting the Moon
Spacecraft that impacted the Moon